Jean Faurez (1905–1980) was a French film director, screenwriter and producer.  During the late 1930s he worked as an assistant director.

Selected filmography
 Opéra-musette (1942)
 Love Around the Clock (1943)
 Night Shift (1944)
 Girl with Grey Eyes (1945)
 Vire-vent (1946)
 Counter Investigation (1947)
 Les vagabonds du rêve (1949)
 La vie en rose (1948)
 Quai du Point-du-Jour (1960)
 La parole est au témoin (1963)

References

Bibliography
 DeMaio, Patricia A. Garden of Dreams: The Life of Simone Signoret. Univ. Press of Mississippi,  2014.
 Rège, Philippe . Encyclopedia of French Film Directors, Volume 1. Scarecrow Press, 2009.
 Turk, Edward Baron . Child of Paradise: Marcel Carné and the Golden Age of French Cinema. Harvard University Press, 1989.

External links

1905 births
1980 deaths
People from  Courbevoie
French film directors
French screenwriters